Miriam Talisa Soto (born March 27, 1967) is an American former actress and former model. She is known for portraying Bond girl Lupe Lamora in the 1989 James Bond film Licence to Kill, and as Kitana in the 1995 fantasy action film Mortal Kombat and its 1997 sequel Mortal Kombat: Annihilation. Prior to her acting career, Soto worked as a model, appearing in magazines such as Mademoiselle, Glamour and Elle.

Early life 
Soto was born in Brooklyn, New York City, the youngest of four children of parents who moved to New York from Puerto Rico. During her early childhood, her parents moved to Northampton, Massachusetts, where Soto and her siblings were raised and educated in public schools.

Career

Modeling 
At age 15, Soto signed with Click Model Management and began modeling during summer vacations. Weeks after being signed, she traveled to Paris where she appeared in a layout for Vogue shot by Bruce Weber. Soto returned to Northampton after the summer to resume her schooling. She modeled only on occasion until after she graduated from high school.

She later was featured on the covers of American and British Vogue, British Elle, Mademoiselle, Glamour and Self magazines. Soto has also been featured in advertising campaigns for Calvin Klein, Cartier, Clarins, Revlon, Salvatore Ferragamo, Saks Fifth Avenue, and Versace.

Soto appeared in her first music video with former boyfriend Nick Kamen, behind Madonna's song "Each Time You Break My Heart", directed by Tony Viramontes. Soto and Kamen were often used as models by Ray Petri, the late fashion stylist and creator of the 1980s London "Buffalo Boy" look.

Acting 
In 1988, when Soto returned to the United States, she auditioned and landed the role of "India" in her feature debut, Spike of Bensonhurst, a comedy starring Sasha Mitchell and Ernest Borgnine. In 1988, Soto was cast as Lupe Lamora, in the James Bond film Licence to Kill, starring Timothy Dalton, and as Maria Rivera in The Mambo Kings.

Soto has appeared in more than twenty films, including Mortal Kombat (1995) as Kitana; Island of the Dead as Melissa O'Keefe; Piñero (2001) as Sugar, starring Benjamin Bratt; and Ballistic: Ecks vs. Sever (2002) as Ryne alongside Lucy Liu and Antonio Banderas. Soto also made two guest appearances on the television series C-16: FBI.

In 1995, she played the role of Doña Julia, Johnny Depp's first love interest in the tongue-in-cheek romantic comedy Don Juan DeMarco, Depp playing the title role. She also made an appearance in Marc Anthony's music video for "I Need to Know". In 1996, Soto played the title role in the campy film Vampirella based on the comic book character. Her last major film appearance was in Ballistic: Ecks vs. Sever before retiring from acting after marrying Benjamin Bratt.

She made one more film, La Mission (2009), which was directed by her brother-in-law Peter Bratt.

Public image 
In 1990, Soto was chosen by People as one of the 50 Most Beautiful People in the World. In 1995, she was featured in the Sports Illustrated "Swimsuit Issue". She was ranked #58 on the Maxim Hot 100 Women of 2002.

Personal life 
In 1997, Soto married actor Costas Mandylor. They divorced in 2000.

Soto and actor Benjamin Bratt began a relationship when they attended the premiere of Piñero at the Montreal World Film Festival. They had played lovers in the film. They married on April 13, 2002, in San Francisco, and have two children.

Filmography

Awards and nominations

References

External links 

 
 

1967 births
Living people
Actresses from Massachusetts
Actresses from New York City
American actresses of Puerto Rican descent
American female models
American film actresses
American television actresses
People from Brooklyn
People from Northampton, Massachusetts
20th-century American actresses
21st-century American actresses